Moreno Di Biase (born 5 November 1975) is an Italian former professional racing cyclist. He rode in five editions of the Giro d'Italia.

Major results

1996
1st Trofeo Città di Castelfidardo
1997
1st Trofeo Franco Balestra
1st Gran Premio San Giuseppe
1st Stage 6 Giro delle Regioni
1999
1st Stage 5 Tour de Langkawi
1st Stage 6 Tour de Slovénie
1st Stage 1 Tour of Japan
2000
1st Stage 5 Giro d'Abruzzo
6th Giro della Provincia di Siracusa
9th Giro di Campania
2001
8th Giro della Provincia di Siracusa
8th Criterium d'Abruzzo
2002
Tour de Langkawi
1st Stages 4 & 7
1st Stage 3 Brixia Tour
2003
1st Stage 2 Tour of Georgia
2005
7th Giro della Provincia di Reggio Calabria

Grand Tour general classification results timeline

References

External links
 

1975 births
Living people
Italian male cyclists
People from Lanciano
Cyclists from Abruzzo
Sportspeople from the Province of Chieti
21st-century Italian people